José Manuel Blecua Teijeiro (Alcolea de Cinca, Huesca, 10 November 1913 – Barcelona, 9 March 2003) was a Spanish philologist, professor of Spanish Literature at the University of Barcelona and a member of the Royal Spanish Academy.

He took his bachelor's degree at the College of Saint Thomas Aquinas in Zaragoza, under the tutelage of Miguel Labordeta. At the University of Zaragoza he studied Law and Philosophy. He was a teacher for twenty years at the Cuevas Institute in Almanzora and, later, at the Goya Institute in Zaragoza. In 1959, he moved to the Universidad de Barcelona, where he was one of the founders of the Spanish Philological Institute.

Blecua specialized in poetry and literature from the "Siglo de Oro". He published many works on that period and produced a monumental critical edition of the poetry of Francisco de Quevedo. He also edited a major anthology of Spanish Renaissance poetry.

In 1993, he was awarded the seventh Menéndez Pelayo International Prize. An institute in Zaragoza has been named after him.

Selected works
 Los Pájaros en la Poesía Española Hispanica (1943)
 Las Flores en la Poesía Española Hispanica (1944)
 Preceptiva Literaria y Nociones de Gramática Histórica, Aula (1944)
 Historia General de la Literatura, Librería General (1944)
 El Mar en la Poesía Española Hispanica (1945)
 Lengua Española, Librería General (1959)
 Los Géneros Literarios y su Historia, Librería General (1961)
 Historia y Textos de la Literatura Española, Librería General (1963)
 Sobre Poesía de la Edad de Oro: Ensayos y Notas Eruditas, Gredos (1970)
 Lingüística y Significacíon, Salvat (1973) 
 Sobre el Rigor Poético en España y Otros Ensayos, Ariel (1977) 
 Homenajes y Otras Labores, Institución Fernando el Católico (1990)

References

External links
Dialectus: Diario de un Académico de Provincias, by Antonio Viudas Camarasa
Juan Manuel Cacho. "José Manuel Blecua (1913-2003)", in: Asociación Hispánica de Literatura Medieval. Miembros de Honor 

Spanish philologists
Spanish literary critics
1913 births
2003 deaths
Academic staff of the University of Barcelona
University of Zaragoza alumni
Members of the Royal Spanish Academy
People from Cinca Medio
20th-century philologists